The autopilot, or automatic pilot, is an aircraft system that automatically maintains a predetermined route or trajectory.

Autopilot may also refer to:

Vehicles
 Self-steering gear, a ship's system to automatically maintain a chosen course
 Tesla Autopilot, an advanced driver-assistance system offered on Tesla cars

Music
 Automatic Pilot, a 1980s music group created by members of the San Francisco Gay Men's Chorus
 Autopilot (album), the fourth studio album released by American band The Samples
 "Autopilot", song from Coming Up for Air (Kodaline album)
"Autopilot", Matthew Ryan Concussion (album)
"Autopilot", Parts & Labor Groundswell (album)
 "Autopilot", a song by Seam from The Problem With Me

See also 
 Unmanned aircraft
 Unmanned vehicle